Crawford County is a county located in the north central portion of the U.S. state of Ohio. As of the 2020 census, the population was 42,025. Its county seat and largest city is Bucyrus. The county was created in 1820 and later organized in 1836. It was named for Colonel William Crawford, a soldier during the American Revolution.

Crawford County comprises the Bucyrus, OH Micropolitan Statistical Area, which is also included in the Mansfield-Ashland-Bucyrus, OH Combined Statistical Area.

Geography
It is the fourth-smallest county in Ohio by total area.

The county is drained by the Sandusky and Olentangy Rivers.

Adjacent counties
Seneca County (north)
Huron County (northeast)
Richland County (east)
Morrow County (southeast)
Marion County (southwest)
Wyandot County (west)

Demographics

2000 census
As of the census of 2000, there were 46,966 people, 18,957 households, and 13,175 families living in the county. The population density was 117 people per square mile (45/km2). There were 20,178 housing units at an average density of 50 per square mile (19/km2). The racial makeup of the county was 97.99% White, 0.59% Black or African American, 0.20% Native American, 0.31% Asian, 0.02% Pacific Islander, 0.24% from other races, and 0.65% from two or more races. 0.77% of the population were Hispanic or Latino of any race. 40.4% were of German, 21.4% American, 8.1% English and 7.8% Irish ancestry according to Census 2000.

There were 18,957 households, out of which 31.20% had children under the age of 18 living with them, 55.10% were married couples living together, and 30.50% were non-families. 26.30% of all households were made up of individuals, and 11.50% had someone living alone who was 65 years of age or older. The average household size was 2.45 and the average family size was 2.94.

In the county, the population was spread out, with 24.90% under the age of 18, 8.00% from 18 to 24, 27.60% from 25 to 44, 24.30% from 45 to 64, and 15.20% who were 65 years of age or older. The median age was 38 years. For every 100 females there were 93.40 males. For every 100 females age 18 and over, there were 90.80 males.

The median income for a household in the county was $36,227, and the median income for a family was $43,169. Males had a median income of $33,319 versus $21,346 for females. The per capita income for the county was $17,466. About 7.80% of families and 10.40% of the population were below the poverty line, including 13.70% of those under age 18 and 7.50% of those age 65 or over.

According to the United States Census Bureau, women make up about 51.3% of the population, .

2010 census
As of the 2010 United States Census, there were 43,784 people, 18,099 households, and 12,108 families living in the county. The racial makeup of the county was 97.2% white, 0.9% black or African American, 0.4% Asian, 0.1% American Indian, 0.3% from other races, and 1.1% from two or more races. Those of Hispanic or Latino origin made up 1.2% of the population. In terms of ancestry, 43.3% were German, 14.3% were Irish, 13.7% were American, and 11.0% were English.

Of the 18,099 households, 29.9% had children under the age of 18 living with them, 50.6% were married couples living together, 11.5% had a female householder with no husband present, 33.1% were non-families, and 28.4% of all households were made up of individuals. The average household size was 2.39 and the average family size was 2.89. The median age was 41.9 years.

The median income for a household in the county was $41,228 and the median income for a family was $49,647. Males had a median income of $40,304 versus $28,118 for females. The per capita income for the county was $20,590. About 10.8% of families and 13.0% of the population were below the poverty line, including 21.3% of those under age 18 and 6.2% of those age 65 or over.

Politics
Prior to 1924, Crawford County was a strongly Democratic county. Since 1924, it has become strongly Republican, only backing Democratic candidates three times since then.

Wind power plants are prohibited in Crawford County. In 2022, the county voted overwhelmingly to uphold the ban.

|}

Communities

Cities
Bucyrus (county seat)
Galion

Villages
Chatfield
Crestline
New Washington
North Robinson
Tiro

Townships

Auburn
Bucyrus
Chatfield
Cranberry
Dallas
Holmes
Jackson
Jefferson
Liberty
Lykens
Polk
Sandusky
Texas
Tod
Vernon
Whetstone

https://web.archive.org/web/20160715023447/http://www.ohiotownships.org/township-websites

Census-designated places
Oceola
Sulphur Springs

Unincorporated communities
Benton
Brokensword
DeKalb
Leesville
Lykens
Mechanicsburg
Middletown
Monnett
New Winchester
Olentangy
Waynesburg
West Liberty

Libraries
The following libraries serve the communities of Crawford County.
 Bucyrus Public Library in Bucyrus, Ohio
 Crestline Public Library in Crestline, Ohio
 Galion Public Library in Galion, Ohio

See also
National Register of Historic Places listings in Crawford County, Ohio

References

Further reading

 John E. Hopley, History of Crawford County and Ohio: Containing a History of the State of Ohio, from its Earliest Settlement to the Present Time... Chicago: Baskin and Battey, Historical Publishers, 1881.

External links

Crawford County Government's website

 
1826 establishments in Ohio
Populated places established in 1826